Kayvon Thibodeaux (born December 15, 2000) is an American football outside linebacker for the New York Giants of the National Football League (NFL). A native of Los Angeles, he was named USA Today High School Football Defensive Player of the Year in 2018. 

Thibodeaux played college football at Oregon, where was named the Pac-12 Defensive Freshman of the Year in 2019, won the Morris Trophy in 2020, and was voted a unanimous All-American in 2021. He was drafted by the Giants fifth overall in the 2022 NFL Draft.

High school career 
Thibodeaux was born in South Los Angeles, California, on December 15, 2000. He attended and played football at Susan Miller Dorsey High School for two years before transferring to Oaks Christian School in 2017. He was named the High School Football Defensive Player of the Year by the USA Today after recording 18 sacks and 54 tackles during his senior season in 2018. 

Thibodeaux recorded 152 total tackles, 54 sacks, and eight forced fumbles during his high school career, and was the second-highest rated overall player in the 2019 recruiting class. He accepted a scholarship to play college football for the Oregon Ducks at the University of Oregon over several other offers.

College career
Thibodeaux was named the Pac-12 Defensive Freshman of the Year in 2019. As a sophomore, he won the Morris Trophy on defense and was named first-team All-Pac-12 while also winning MVP honors of the 2020 Pac-12 Football Championship Game. Thibodeaux suffered a sprained ankle in the first game of his junior season, and sat out the following two games. He recorded seven sacks in 2021 and was unanimously voted to the 2021 College Football All-America Team. Following the season, Thibodeaux announced that he would forgo his senior year and declared for the 2022 NFL Draft.

College statistics

Professional career

2022
Thibodeaux was selected fifth overall by the New York Giants in the 2022 NFL Draft. Thibodeax suffered a sprained MCL in Week 2 of the preseason against the Cincinnati Bengals.

Thibodeaux made his NFL debut against the Dallas Cowboys in Week 3, where he had one tackle in the 23-16 loss. In Week 6 against the Baltimore Ravens, Thibodeaux had his first career sack, forcing a game-winning fumble by quarterback Lamar Jackson in the fourth quarter during the 24-20 win. On December 18, 2022, against the Washington Commanders, Thibodeaux completed a forced fumble and recovery for his first career touchdown. His performance earned him the NFC Defensive Player of the Week for Week 15.

In Week 17, Thibodeaux sacked Colts quarterback Nick Foles. Despite Foles writhing on the ground with a rib injury, Thibodeaux could be seen celebrating the sack by pretending to make snow angels. As Foles was being carted off the field, Thibodeaux could be seen mimicking Foles "going to sleep." Although he was not penalized or fined, Thibodeaux's celebration was widely criticized by fans, analysts and Colts players as disrespectful and unsportsmanlike. 

He started and appeared in 14 games as a rookie. He finished with four sacks, 49 total tackles, five passes defended, and two forced fumbles. He was named to the 2022 PFWA All-Rookie Team.

NFL career statistics

Regular season

Personal life
In July 2021, Thibodeaux announced a collaboration with Nike CEO Phil Knight and shoe designer Tinker Hatfield to design non-fungible token (NFT) artwork. He launched his own cryptocurrency, "$JREAM", in September 2021. It was named after the Jream Foundation, which Thibodeaux also founded. Thibodeaux graduated from the University of Oregon with a degree in journalism-advertising.

Thibodeaux is an avid chess player, saying he used chess principles to hone his skills as a football player. He began playing chess at a young age, watching his uncles play the board game. Playing online chess became a passion for him. He was selected as a player for Chess.com's BlitzChamp tournament, a rapid tournament for NFL players.

References

External links 

New York Giants bio
Oregon Ducks bio

2000 births
Living people
People from South Los Angeles
New York Giants players
Players of American football from Los Angeles
American football defensive ends
American football outside linebackers
Oregon Ducks football players
All-American college football players
African-American players of American football